"The Boys Are Back in Town" is a song by Irish hard rock band Thin Lizzy. The song was originally released in 1976 as the first single from their album Jailbreak. It is considered by Rolling Stone to be the band's best song, placing it at No. 272 on the 2021 edition of the "500 Greatest Songs of All Time" list.

Single release information
The original 1976 UK single release featured the album track "Emerald" as a B-side, although in some territories "Jailbreak" was chosen. The single was remixed and re-released in several formats in March 1991, after the success of the "Dedication" single, reaching No. 63 in the UK. The 12" EP featured the extra tracks "Johnny the Fox Meets Jimmy the Weed", "Black Boys on the Corner" and a live version of "Me and the Boys".

There are many theories regarding the inspiration behind "The Boys Are Back in Town", although none has been verified. One theory is that it is about the Quality Street Gang.

Reception 
"It was 1976 and we were touring America", recalled Scott Gorham. "Jailbreak wasn't shifting and we weren't selling any tickets".  The band were surprised to learn from their manager that "The Boys Are Back in Town" was becoming a hit record, especially as the track had not been among the ten songs originally chosen by the band for the album. Gorham attributed the song's unexpected success to two DJs in Louisville, Kentucky who "played it incessantly until other stations in the surrounding area picked up on it… Had that song not kickstarted the sales of the album, then the band was over."

It was given 499th position among the 2004 Rolling Stones 500 Greatest Songs of All Time, though was not included in the 2010 update. However, it re-entered the list in the 2021 update at an even higher position than before at number 272. Rolling Stone praised lead singer and bassist Phil Lynott's "Gaelic soul" and said the "twin-guitar lead by Scott Gorham and Brian Robertson" was "crucial to the song's success". The song is played at most Irish Rugby matches, and has appeared in numerous commercials, most recently in a 2019 ad for Applebee's, television shows, and feature films. In March 2005, Q magazine placed "The Boys Are Back in Town" at No. 38 in its list of the 100 Greatest Guitar Tracks. The song won a 1976 NME Award for Best Single.

The song was used on various trailers for the Disney Pixar films Toy Story and Toy Story 2, and Rick and Morty’s 4th season, and is also heard in the 1990 action film Navy SEALs, in the 1999 comedy film Detroit Rock City, and in the 2013 video game Saint's Row IV.

2012 Republican National Convention use
At the 2012 Republican National Convention, the song was used to introduce then Vice-Presidential candidate Paul Ryan on stage. This unauthorised use of the song caused controversy. Both Lynott's mother, Philomena Lynott, and Thin Lizzy lead guitarist Gorham criticised its use, suggesting that Lynott would not have wanted his music used for any political purpose, including endorsing politicians, and furthermore would likely have objected to the policies of Ryan and his running mate Mitt Romney.

Charts

Weekly charts

Year-end charts

Certifications

Cover versions

Happy Mondays version
A cover version of The Boys Are Back in Town became the last Top 40 single for the Manchester rock band Happy Mondays (featuring vocalist Shaun Ryder and dancer Bez), when it peaked at number 24 in the UK Singles Chart in May 1999. According to the band they did not think that their version was a straight cover, but a record "inspired by the Phil Lynott song, but doesn't sound a thing like the original".

References

External links
 

1976 singles
1976 songs
1991 singles
Thin Lizzy songs
Songs written by Phil Lynott
Blues rock songs
Irish Singles Chart number-one singles
Mercury Records singles
Vertigo Records singles